is a Japanese graphic designer best known for his work on the ISO Standard exit sign and the pictorial language LoCoS.

Biography 

Yukio Ota was born in 1939. He graduated from the Tama Art University in 1962. He went on to develop the pictorial language LoCoS starting in 1964, before starting work at Tokyo Zokei University in 1967. In 1979, he created the "running man" exit sign for a competition held by a Japanese fire safety association, which was eventually adapted as a part of the ISO 7010 standard in 1985 or 1987. He also worked at Tama Art University from 1985, where he became a professor. As of 2020, he serves as a director of the Japan Society for Science of Signs.

Works 
 LoCoS (1964)
 Ministry of Economy, Trade and Industry logo (1975)
 ISO Standard exit sign (1979)

References

Japanese graphic designers
1939 births
Living people